|}

The Esher Cup is a flat handicap horse race in Great Britain open to horses aged three years old. It is run at Sandown Park over a distance of 1 mile, and it is scheduled to take place each year in late April.

Records
Leading jockey since 1988 (3 wins):
 Michael Hills – Amyas (1997), Tiger Talk (1999), Desert Dew (2007)
 Silvestre de Sousa - Grey Mirage (2012), Czabo (2016), Merlin Magic (2018)

Leading trainer since 1988 (5 wins):
 Richard Hannon Sr. - Rapid Coracle (1991), Eastern Memories (1993), Stash The Cash (1994), Prince Samos (2005), Commander Cave (2008)

Winners since 1988

See also 
 Horse racing in Great Britain
 List of British flat horse races

References

 Paris-Turf:
Racing Post
, 

Flat races in Great Britain
Flat horse races for three-year-olds
Sandown Park Racecourse